Johnson William Haywood (11 April 1899–1977) was an English footballer who played in the Football League for Barrow, Chelsea and Halifax Town.

References

1899 births
1977 deaths
English footballers
Association football forwards
English Football League players
Chelsea F.C. players
Halifax Town A.F.C. players
Yeovil Town F.C. players
Portsmouth F.C. players
Barrow A.F.C. players
Weymouth F.C. players
Scunthorpe United F.C. players
Denaby United F.C. players